Metamorfosi (before 1957: Koukouvaounes is a suburb in the northern part of the Athens agglomeration, Greece, and a municipality of the Attica region.

Geography

Metamorfosi is situated east of the small river Kifisos, 9 km north of Athens city centre. The municipality has an area of 5.502 km2. The built-up area of Metamorfosi is continuous with those of the neighbouring suburbs Lykovrysi, Irakleio and Nea Filadelfeia. Motorway 1 and Motorway 6 intersect in Metamorfosi. The town is served by a Proastiakos suburban railway station.

Historical population

See also
List of municipalities of Attica

References

External links

City of Metamorfosi official website 

Municipalities of Attica
Populated places in North Athens (regional unit)